Rosemary Nansubuga Seninde, also Rosemary Nansubuga Sseninde (née Rosemary Nansubuga) (born 7 January 1965), is a Ugandan educator and politician. She is the State Minister for Primary Education in the Ugandan Cabinet. She was appointed to that position on 6 June 2016, replacing John Chrysostom Muyingo who became State Minister for Higher Education. She concurrently serves as the Wakiso District Women's Representative in the Parliament of Uganda.

Background and education
Rosemary Nansubuga was born in Wakiso District on 7 January 1965. She went to St. Agnes Boarding Primary School in Naggalama for her early elementary schooling. She then attended St. Joseph's Senior Secondary School in Nsambya for her O-Level studies, graduating in 1982. She studied at Trinity College Nabbingo for her A-Level education, graduating in 1985.

In 1997 she obtained a Teaching Certificate from Lady Irene College, in Ndejje, now a component of Ndejje University. The following year, she attended a 10-week course at the National Institute of Small Industries Extension Training (NISIET), in Hyderabad, India, graduating with a certificate.

In 2001, she graduated with a Diploma in Education, awarded by the Institute of Teacher Education (ITEK), now a component of Kyambogo University. In 2005, she graduated with a Bachelor of Arts in Human Resource Management, awarded by Makerere University. Later in 2009, she was awarded a Master of Arts in ethics and public management.

Teaching career
She began her teaching career in 1987, as a teacher/instructor at a boarding elementary school, serving in that capacity until 1994. She then transferred to Wampeewo Senior Secondary School as a teacher, serving in that capacity until 2000. In 2001, for a period of less than one year, she worked as a tutor/instructor at Shimoni Teacher Training College.

Politics
In 2001, she entered elective Ugandan politics and was elected to the Parliament of Uganda to represent the women of Wakiso District. She was reelected in 2006, 2011 and 2016, and is the incumbent. In the cabinet appointed on 6 June 2016, she was named the State Minister for primary education.

Personal
Rosemary Nansubuga Sseninde is married to Zephaniah Kizza Kikoba Walube Sseninde since 12 October 1985. She is the mother of seven children. Her daughter, Jean Sseninde, is a professorial soccer player, with the London Phoenix ladies team, in the English Second League.

See also
 Cabinet of Uganda
 Parliament of Uganda

References

External links
 Website of the Parliament of Uganda

Living people
Ganda people
1965 births
People from Wakiso District
Members of the Parliament of Uganda
National Resistance Movement politicians
Makerere University alumni
Kyambogo University alumni
Ndejje University alumni
People from Central Region, Uganda
Women government ministers of Uganda
Women members of the Parliament of Uganda
Government ministers of Uganda
People educated at Trinity College Nabbingo
21st-century Ugandan politicians
21st-century Ugandan women politicians